Jump Ship Quick is an American and a Canadian Christian hardcore band that primarily plays hardcore punk and punk rock. They come from Denver, Colorado and British Columbia, Canada. The band started making music in 2005, and their members are lead vocalist and bassist, Nic, guitarists, Jeff and Dave, and drummer, J. Their first studio album, Where Thieves Cannot Tread, was released in 2012 by Thumper Punk Records in association with Punk Roxx Records.

Background
Jump Ship Quick is a Christian hardcore band from the areas of Denver, Colorado and British Columbia, Canada. Their members are lead vocalist and bassist, Nic, guitarists, Jeff and Dave, and drummer, J.

Music history
The band commenced as a musical entity in June 2005 with their release, Where Thieves Cannot Tread, a studio album, that was released by Thumper Punk Records on June 5, 2012.

Members
Current members
 Nic - lead vocals, bass
 Jeff - guitar
 Dave - guitar
 J - drums

Discography
Studio albums
 Where Thieves Cannot Tread (June 5, 2012, Thumper Punk/Punk Roxx)

References

External links
Official website

Christian hardcore musical groups
Punk rock groups from Colorado
Musical groups from British Columbia
Musical groups established in 2005